Naeem Saad Mubarak Faraj (born 1 October 1957) is a Kuwaiti football defender who played for Kuwait in the 1982 FIFA World Cup. He also played for Tadamon.

References

External links
FIFA profile

1957 births
Kuwaiti footballers
Kuwait international footballers
Association football defenders
1982 FIFA World Cup players
Olympic footballers of Kuwait
Footballers at the 1980 Summer Olympics
Living people
1980 AFC Asian Cup players
1984 AFC Asian Cup players
1988 AFC Asian Cup players
Asian Games medalists in football
Footballers at the 1982 Asian Games
Footballers at the 1986 Asian Games
Asian Games silver medalists for Kuwait
Medalists at the 1982 Asian Games
Al Tadhamon SC players
Kuwait Premier League players